Toss is a 2007 Telugu film written and directed by Priyadarshini Ram. The film stars Upendra, Raja, Kamna Jethmalani, and Priyamani in prominent roles. The film was released on 14 July 2007. This is the first film in India to be shot with the Thompson Viper Filmstream Camera by South Indian Cinematographer T. Surendra Reddy.

Plot 
Parasuram (Raja) is a self-employed youth with a difference. He does justice to the wrongdoers by charging SET (Self Employment Tax). Neelakanta (Upendra) is an anti-social element who is very fond of his blind sister Naina (Priyamani). They share a dark past. Nayak (Suman), the local police chief, appoints Parasuram as undercover cop to recover  10 crore stolen by Neelakanta. Parasuram gets hold of Naina and makes her fall in love with him. The rest of the story is about the conflict between Parasuram and Neelakanta.

Cast
 Upendra as Neelakanta
 Raja as Parasuram
 Priyamani as Naina
 Ali
 Kamna Jethmalani as Nisha
 Suman
 Vinod Kumar
 Krishna Bhagavaan as Varanda Babu
 Supreeth
 Ramya
 Sudha
 Abhinayashree
 Jeeva
 Venu Madhav

Soundtrack

References

External links 
 

2007 films
2000s Telugu-language films
Films scored by Mani Sharma